The Hamu Al-Qadu Mosque, also known as Hamou Qado Mosque, was a historic mosque located in the city of Mosul, Iraq. The modern mosque was founded by Al-Hajj Abdallah Chalabi in the Ottoman period.

Construction 
The original structure dated back to 1298 AH. It contained the enshrined tomb of Sheikh Ala al-Din, a patron saint. In 1880 AD, Al-Hajj Abdullah Chalabi, who was known as Hamu Al-Qadu, built a mosque and school complex over the original structure. The original structure was demolished and the tomb ended up inside the basement of the present structure.

Demolition 
The original structure was demolished in 1298 AH by Al-Hajj Abdullah Chalabi to build a new structure over it.

In 2015, the mosque was bulldozed by the Islamic State of Iraq and the Levant as part of a campaign to demolish all the historic shrines in Mosul.

References 

Mosques in Mosul
1298 establishments
2015 disestablishments in Iraq